= Poviliūnas =

- Lithuanian surname
- m.: Poviliūnas
- f.: (unmarried): Poviliūnytė
- f.: (married): Poviliūnienė

Poviliūnas is a Lithuanian surname. Notable people with the surname include:

- Antanas Poviliūnas (born 1927), Lithuanian economist, professor
- Artūras Poviliūnas, chairman of the National Olympic Committee of Lithuania
